Shorea peltata (called, along with some other species in the genus Shorea, yellow meranti) is a species of plant in the family Dipterocarpaceae. It is a tree found in Sumatra, Peninsular Malaysia and Borneo.

References

Sources

peltata
Trees of Sumatra
Trees of Peninsular Malaysia
Trees of Borneo
Critically endangered flora of Asia
Taxonomy articles created by Polbot